The  is an annual elite women's road bicycle racing stage race. It was rebranded from 2013-2020 as the Giro Rosa, having been branded the Giro Donne until 2012 and again in 2021. It has been considered the most prestigious stage race in women's road cycling.

History
Previously known as the Giro Donne, the race historically was a nine- or ten-day event taking place in Italy in early July each year, generally competing for attention with the more famous men's . While the rebranded Giro Rosa has kept its position in the racing calendar, it was shortened in 2013 to eight days, before returning to its traditional ten-day length the next year.

With the cancellation of the Tour de l'Aude Cycliste Féminin after 2010, the Giro Donne was the only Grand Tour left in women's cycling, and in December 2012 Wieler Review reported that the company Epinike had withdrawn as Giro Donne organiser, making the 2013 edition uncertain. In April 2013, however, organisers announced a shortened and rebranded Giro, so that the Giro Rosa would go ahead in 2013.

It lost the World Tour status for the 2021 edition, and it has been downgraded to a 2 Pro-level stage race. The decision has been met with criticism.

Winners

Multiple winners

Wins per country

Secondary classifications
The  awards a number of jerseys for winners of certain classifications – the current competitions that award a jersey are:
 ( in 2012) Points classification, for the rider with the most points as awarded by finishing positions on stages and the first riders to go through intermediate sprints.
 Mountains classification, for the rider awarded the most points for crossing designated climbs, generally at the peaks of hills and mountains.
 Young rider classification, for the fastest rider under the age of 25 to complete the race.
 Best Italian rider classification, for the fastest Italian rider to complete the race.
In 2006, the young riders classification was not run, instead a sprints competition was won by Olga Slyusareva (RUS) and awarded the blue jersey.

Winners by year

Winners by country

Stage wins

See also
 Giro della Toscana Int. Femminile – Memorial Michela Fanini
 Giro d'Italia
 Grande Boucle Féminine Internationale
 Tour de France Femmes

Notes

References

External links
 (Italian and English)

 
Cycle races in Italy
Recurring sporting events established in 1988
1988 establishments in Italy
Women's road bicycle races
UCI Women's World Tour races